The Parti culinaire du Québec is a minor provincial political party in Quebec, Canada. Founded in 2018 by Madagascar-born Quebec chef Jean-Louis Thémis, it aims to educate Quebec voters about food and respect for nature.

Background
Jean-Louis Thémis was born Jean-Louis Thémistocle Randriantiana in Madagascar in the 1950s, and moved to Quebec in 1972. Thémis has held a variety of positions in Quebec, including former head of Metro-Richelieu, founder of Cuisiniers sans Frontières (which teaches cooking to low-income communities internationally), and most recently as a teacher at Institut de tourisme et d'hôtellerie du Québec. He announced his retirement from the ITHQ to pursue this project.

Ideology
The keystone of the party's ideology involves the creation of a "gastronocracy", in which farmers and food producers would be viewed as the elites in society. No government decisions would be made that would jeopardize Quebec's food supply, using the proposed Energy East pipeline as an example.

Themis has called for an end to Sunday shopping so that families could eat together, improving food in hospitals and community health centers and the creation of a Ministry of Gastronomy.

The party would like to see artisanal restaurants using local and organic ingredients exempted from Quebec Sales Tax.

Election results
In the 2018 Quebec election, Themis was the party's only candidate, in his home riding of Laurier-Dorion. He received 169 votes, or 0.54% of the votes cast in the riding.

References

Provincial political parties in Quebec
Gastronomical societies
Political parties established in 2018
2018 establishments in Quebec